Skenea areolata is a species of sea snail, a marine gastropod mollusk in the family Skeneidae.

Description
The size of the shell attains 2 mm. The solid, semipellucid, white shell is widely, perspectively umbilicated. It is finely spirally lirate, crossed by close incremental stripe. The three whorls are convex, and moderately increasing in size. The aperture is orbicular. The peristome is thin.

Distribution
This species occurs in the Atlantic Ocean off Iceland and arctic Norway.

References

 Sars G. O., 1878: Bidrag til kundskaben om Norges arktiske fauna: 1. Mollusca regionis Arcticae Norvegiae. Oversigt over de i Norges arktiske region forekommende bloddyr ; Christiania, A.W. Brøgger XV + 466 p., 34 pl

External links
 

areolata
Gastropods described in 1878